John Crisp (27 November 1896 – 1939) was an English footballer who played in the Football League for Blackburn Rovers, Coventry City and West Bromwich Albion.

References

1896 births
1939 deaths
English footballers
Association football forwards
English Football League players
Walsall F.C. players
Aston Villa F.C. players
Leicester City F.C. players
West Bromwich Albion F.C. players
Blackburn Rovers F.C. players
Coventry City F.C. players
Stourbridge F.C. players
Bromsgrove Rovers F.C. players
Cheltenham Town F.C. players
People from Hamstead
Footballers from Staffordshire